The Nemenhah Band is a religious group founded and headed by Phillip "Cloudpiler" Landis. It was founded circa 2000 and claims about 4,000 members. It practices alternative medicine, specifically natural medicine.

The group says that it is composed of Native American healers and those "spiritually adopted" into the band. According to the Nemenhah Band's website, "membership is by spiritual adoption only." Those who seek spiritual adoption must agree that natural healing is a significant part of their spirituality and that they seek to do no harm. The Nemenhah band also provides a curriculum to become a "medicine man" or "medicine woman". Some Native Americans have criticized the group's practices.

Controversy
The group received widespread attention in 2009 when a judge ordered chemotherapy for a 13-year-old boy with Hodgkin's lymphoma whose family were members of the group; his mother fled with her son to avoid the court order, but later returned.  Her son successfully completed chemotherapy and radiation.

References

External links
Nemenhah web site

New religious movements